Ivesia unguiculata is a species of flowering plant in the rose family known by the common name Yosemite mousetail.

Description
This is a perennial herb forming tufts of erect leaves rosetted around stems up to 30 centimeters tall. The leaves are up to 15 centimeters long and are made up of several pairs of lobed leaflets coated in silvery hairs. The inflorescence atop the erect stem is headlike clusters of white or pinkish flowers, each with petals 3 or 4 millimeters long.

Distribution
It is endemic to the Sierra Nevada of California, where it grows in forests and mountain meadows.

External links
Jepson Manual Treatment
Photo gallery

unguiculata
Endemic flora of California
Flora of the Sierra Nevada (United States)
Flora without expected TNC conservation status